Joseph Haydn was a prolific composer of the classical period. He is regarded as the "father of the symphony" and the "father of the string quartet" for his more than 100 symphonies and almost 70 string quartets. Haydn also produced numerous operas, masses, concertos, piano sonatas and other compositions. Haydn's works were catalogued by Anthony van Hoboken in his Hoboken catalogue. Unlike most other catalogues which sort works chronologically, the Hoboken catalogue sorts by musical genre.

Symphonies

Overtures

Divertimentos in 4 and more Parts

String Quartets

Unlike the majority of Haydn's compositions which are known by their Hoboken numbers, his string quartets are best known by their opus number.

Divertimentos in 3 Parts

String Trios

Various Duos

Concertos for various instruments

Marches

Dances

Works for various instruments with Baryton

Trios for Baryton, Violin or Viola and Cello

Duos with Baryton

Concertos for Baryton

Divertimentos with keyboard

Piano Trios

Keyboard Duos

Keyboard sonatas

Keyboard pieces

Keyboard for 4 hands

Keyboard concertos

Pieces for mechanical clock

Versions of The Seven Last Words of Christ and Stabat Mater

Oratorios

Masses, Requiem and Libera me

Other sacred works

Cantatas and arias with orchestra

Songs with 2, 3, and 4 parts

Songs and cantatas with keyboard

Sacred and secular canons

Operas

Marionette operas and musical comedies

Incidental music

Folksong arrangements

Pasticcios

Notes

  

Compositions
Haydn, Joseph